General elections were held in Liechtenstein in March and April 1866. Six of the seats in the Landtag were indirectly elected by electors selected by voters.

Electors 
Electors were selected through elections that were held between 4 March and 22 April. Each municipality had two electors for every 100 inhabitants.

Results
The electors met on 3 May in Vaduz to elect six Landtag members and one substitute member. The Landtag members and the substitute were elected in three ballots. Of the 156 electors, 154 participated in the voting.

Josef Bargetze declined his election and was replaced by Baptist Quaderer.

References 

Liechtenstein
1866 in Liechtenstein
Elections in Liechtenstein
November 1862 events